The Kotwali Gate, commonly known as Kotwali Darwaza, is a medieval gate on the Bangladesh-India border. It marks the international border between the two countries in the northwestern region, dividing Chapai Nawabganj and Malda. It is a former arch and gateway to the ancient walled city of Gaur.

Etymology
The name of the gate originates from the term Kotwal.

History

According to the Archaeological Survey of India, the structure dates back to the era of the Delhi Sultanate between the reigns of Iltutmish (r. 1211–1236) and Alauddin Khalji (r. 1296–1316). According to the British Library, the gate may have been built after the capital of Bengal was re-established in Gaur by the Sultan of Bengal following the relocation from nearby Pandua in 1446.

Architecture
The central arch, which was 9.15 meters high and 5.10 meters wide, has now collapsed. The gate is part of the southern wall of Gaur. Minor decorative arches are still present on the wall. In addition to the collapsed arch, the gate also had semi-circular towers, battlements and apertures to defend the city.

See also
Nimtali arch

References

Gates in Bangladesh
Archaeological sites in Bangladesh
Chapai Nawabganj District
Maldah
Archaeological sites in West Bengal
Ruins in India
Ruins in Bangladesh
Medieval Bengal